Families of September 11, Inc. ("FOS11") is a nonprofit organization founded in October 2001 by families of those who died in the September 11 attacks. Membership is open to anyone affected by the events of September 11, 2001, be they family members, survivors, responders, or others as well as those who support the organization's mission. The group has two goals:
To support families and children by offering updated information on issues of interest, access to resources, relevant articles, and advocacy to raise awareness about the effects of terrorism and public trauma.
To champion domestic and international policies that respond to the threat of terrorism including support for the 9/11 Commission Recommendations, and to reach out to victims of terror worldwide.

Many of the Board Members are professionals who lost immediate family members in the attacks. The members of the Advisory Board bring expertise and knowledge to the organization in specific areas that ably support its goals.

Families of September 11 is committed to offering current and accurate information, to promoting resiliency and strength, to advocating on behalf of its members and issues of importance to them, and to continuing a dialogue with an expanding group of families, friends and supporters.

External links
 FOS11 website
 COS11 website

World Trade Center
Aftermath of the September 11 attacks